Kahr is a German surname. Notable people with the surname include:

 Andrew Kahr, executive
 Claudia Kahr (b 1955), Austrian judge
 Gustav Ritter von Kahr (1862–1934), German politician

See also
 KAHR, radio station
 Kahr Arms, manufacturer
 The Confession of Ina Kahr, a 1954 West German crime film